Czesław Zajac (born July 12, 1968) is a Polish former footballer.

Playing career
Zajac began his professional career in his native Poland in the Ekstraklasa with Pogoń Szczecin in 1992. After appearing in only 2 matches, he signed with Dąb Dębno, a club which mostly featured in the lower leagues. In 1996, he went abroad to Canada and signed with Oakville Canadian Westerns of the Canadian National Soccer League. He reached the playoffs with Oakville by finishing fourth in the league standings. He featured in the semi-final match against Toronto Italia, but unfortunately were eliminated by the eventual playoff champions by a score of 5-4 goals on aggregate.

In April 1997, he signed with the newly expanded franchise Toronto Lynx of the USL A-League. His signing was announced in a press conference which revealed the team roster. Zajac made his debut for the club on April 12, 1997 in the Lynx's first official match against Jacksonville Cyclones; the game would eventually result in a 3-1 defeat for the fledgling side. Unfortunately, after appearing in only 2 matches, he was released from his contract. For the remainder of the year, he returned to the CNSL and signed with Toronto Supra. Zajac made his debut on June 13, 1997 against Toronto Croatia in 0-0 draw. Supra reached the cup finals, but once more Zajac failed to win a piece of silverware after losing 4-3 on goals on aggregate to St. Catharines Wolves.

The following year, he signed with Toronto Croatia of the newly formed Canadian Professional Soccer League. He made his debut on June 3, 1998 in an Open Canada Cup match against Glen Shields in a 3-1 defeat. He would score his first two goals in the next match against London City in a 5-1 victory. In 1999, Zajac returned to the Croatian side, but missed the majority of the season due to an injury and managed to return late in the season to help Toronto finish second in the league standings, clinching a postseason berth. In the postseason, he contributed a goal in a 5-2 victory over Glen Shields in the semifinals, and advanced to the playoff finals but were defeated by the Toronto Olympians in a 2-0 victory.

Personal life 
His son Marcel Zajac also became a footballer.

His daughter Nicole Zajac also became a footballer.

References 

1968 births
Living people
People from Duszniki-Zdrój
Canadian Soccer League (1998–present) players
Ekstraklasa players
Polish footballers
Pogoń Szczecin players
Toronto Croatia players
Toronto Lynx players
SC Toronto players
Sportspeople from Lower Silesian Voivodeship
Canadian National Soccer League players
Association football midfielders